Jonathan Gray (born May 5, 1999) is a Canadian actor known for the series Max & Shred.

Career 
Jonathan Gray was born in Ilderton, Ontario, Canada. In 2012, he won a video contest to become a reporter for the King's Cup Elephant Polo Tournament in Thailand. In 2014, he was cast in the main role in the series Max & Shred on Nickelodeon, interpreting Max Asher. He is currently studying science at a University.

Filmography

References

External links
 
 

1999 births
Living people
Canadian male child actors
Canadian male television actors
Male actors from London, Ontario
21st-century Canadian male actors